Josefina Stubbs (born November 25, 1959) is a development practitioner and was nominated by the Government of the Dominican Republic for President of the International Fund for Agricultural Development (IFAD) in the 2017 elections. Josefina Stubbs has dedicated her career to the plight of poor women and men around the world. Between 1984 and 2000, she managed national and regional programs for Oxfam UK where she strongly advocated for smallholder farmers’ participation in decision-making and project design. Between 2000 and 2008, Stubbs led several initiatives at the World Bank aimed to strengthen the inclusion and participation of rural communities and marginalized groups in development policies and investment programs. In IFAD, where she served from 2008 until 2016 – when her candidacy for President of IFAD was announced – Stubbs focused on fostering dialogue and collaboration within and between countries, improving aid effectiveness and impact measurement, and design IFAD’s strategy for 2016-2025. She has contributed to position IFAD as the world’s leader in inclusive rural transformation, and placed smallholder farmers at the center of Agenda 2030 for Sustainable Development.

Early life and education 
Stubbs was born in Sanchez, Samana, a small town on the eastern coast of the Dominican Republic and raised in the capital city, Santo Domingo. She attended the Colegio Santo Domingo and Quisqueya where from the very early years she excelled as a student and as leader. Her mother, Bienvenida Mercedes, a school teacher for over 40 years, taught generations of Dominican women and men. Her father, an engineer, was educated in the Dominican Republic and in Mexico. Her sisters Paulina and Carolina are in the field of science and engineering, and management.

Stubbs attended the Universidad Autónoma de Santo Domingo where she earned a B. Sc. in Psychology in 1981 and a M.A in Sociology in 1983. In 1991, she earned a M. Sc. In Political Science and International Development at the Institute of Social Science, in The Hague, Holland.

Professional career 
Stubbs started her career in Oxfam in 1984 in her home country. She worked with grassroots organizations and local groups, donor organizations and governments, pioneering a participatory decision-making process that including poor urban and rural communities. Her legacy in the Dominican Republic includes the entrance of small scale producers of coffee, cocoa and banana in the then nascent fair trade market in Europe with companies such as Max Havelaar and in the United States with Starbucks. Between 1997 and 2000, she was appointed Regional Director for the Caribbean, Mexico and Central America, where she continued to empower grassroots organizations to increase and improve their production and enter formal food and commodity markets.
 
In 1995, in her functions as Director of the Caribbean and Central America region of Oxfam UK she forged the first model of partnership with other Oxfam offices, forming the basis for today’s Oxfam International.

Between 2000 and 2006, she served as Sector Leader at the World Bank in Rural, Environment and Social Development. At the Bank, Stubbs designed and introduced policies and operational procedures in the areas of gender and economic empowerment, integration of people of African descent and indigenous peoples in World Bank operations and community-driven development programs, and led the mainstreaming of inclusive social safeguard policies for rural sector investments. Stubbs also led the design and implementation of the new analytical, financial and policy instruments for the systematic inclusion of women, people of African descent and indigenous peoples in mainstream development programs.

In 2008, Stubbs was appointed Regional Director in the Latin America and the Caribbean Division of the International Fund for Agricultural Development (IFAD), where she continued working to introduce innovations and foster dialogue and cooperation between governments, co-financiers, the private sector and civil society. In 2014, she became IFAD’s Associate Vice-President for the new Strategy and Knowledge, leading the Department to produce IFAD’s Strategy 2016-2025, the Rural Development Report 2016, a new corporate program effectiveness and impacts reporting system, and an innovative results and impact measurement framework for improved aid effectiveness. Under her leadership, IFAD was recognized as the world’s leader in fostering inclusive rural transformation, with smallholder farmers at the center of Agenda 2030 for Sustainable Development.

References

Josefina Stubbs josefinastubbs.net
 Osava, M & Kamal, B. FIDA 2017 - Place aux femmes dans le développement rural. IPS News. 6 February 2017.
 Osava, M & Kamal, B. É tempo das mulheres no setor rural. IPS Noticias. 6 February 2017.
 Osava, M & Kamal, B. FIDA 2017 – Tiempo de las mujeres en el desarrollo rural. IPS Noticias. 6 February 2017.
 Osava, M & Kamal, B. IFAD 2017 – It’s Women’s Turn in Rural Development. IPS News. 6 February 2017.
 Stubbs, J. Investing in poor rural communities makes business sense. 2 February 2017.
 Stubbs, J. La paz se siembra con el desarrollo rural. IPS News. 25 January 2017.
 Stubbs, J. Récolter la paix: comment le développement rural fonctionne pour la prévention des conflits. IPS News. 25 January 2017.
 Stubbs, J. Harvesting peace: how rural development works for conflict prevention. IPS News. 23 January 2017.
 Stubbs, J. How a changing climate affects what makes it onto your plate. 9 January 2017.
 Stubbs, J. Food for the soul – a recipe for transforming poor rural communities.  21 December 2016.
 Pita, A. “Dar oportunidades al mundo rural es la única manera de regular la migración”. El País. Planeta Futuro. 25 November 2016.
 Stubbs, J. Powerless and bruised: why violence against women hurts development. 25 November 2016.
 Lewis, D & Stubbs, J. Thriving Rural Communities Is a Recipe for Healthy Cities. IPS News. 17 November 2016.
 Lewis, D & Stubbs, J. Las ciudades saludables requieren comunidades rurales prósperas. IPS News. 17 November 2016.
 Lewis, D & Stubbs, J. Les Communautés Rurales Florissantes Sont Une Recette Pour Des Villes Saines. IPS News. 17 November 2016.
 Stubbs, J. Statement by Josefina Stubbs, Chief Strategist and Associate Vice President. World Humanitarian Summit. 24 May 2016
 Kumar, A. World will make it in terms of SDGs only if India can: Josefina Stubbs, IFAD. OneWorld South Asia. 23 May 2016.
 Kamal, B. We Cannot Keep Jumping from Crisis to Crisis. IPS News. 20 May 2016.
 Stubbs, J. Opening remarks at the India Country Programme Evaluation National Round-table Workshop. IFAD. 12 May 2016.
 Press release. Global Forum on Nutrition-Sensitive Social Protection Programs took place in Moscow. Social and Industrial Food Service Institute. 10 September 2015.
 Pasquini, E. L. IFAD VP: Career success isn't a mystery, it's hard work. Devex. 25 August 2015.
 Rai EXPO 2015. Stubbs: “1 more billion people out of poverty”. Interview with Associate Vice-president of Ifad about the ‘Millennium goals’, to be reached within 2015. 26 June 2015.
 Servicios DICOM. Vicepresidente del FIDA visita a Medina. El Caribe. 23 May 2015.
 Press release. Presidente Danilo Medina recibe a vicepresidenta del FIDA, Josefina Stubbs. Presidencia de la República Dominicana. 22 May 2015.
 Press release. Danilo Medina se reúne con Josefina Stubbs, nueva vicepresidenta del FIDA. Presidencia de la República Dominicana. 28 September 2014.
 Feliz, N. Designan a Josefina Stubbs en Vicepresidencia Adjunta del FIDA. Atento rd. 20 September 2014.
 Press release. Presidente Medina recibe a directora del FIDA. Presidencia de la República Dominicana. 2 June 2014.
 Press release. El FIDA apoyará al país en lucha contra la pobreza. Presidencia de la República Dominicana. 23 March 2013.
 Stubbs, J. Leveraging Private Partnerships: Smallholders tap new markets in Guatemala. International Trade Forum Partnerships. 1 October 2011
 Ponce, J. (Josefina Stubbs & Hiska N. Reyes ed.). Más allá de los prometidos: Afrodescendientes en América Latina-Los Afroecuatorianos. (2006). The International Bank for Reconstruction and Development/ The World Bank. Retrieved from: http://siteresources.worldbank.org/INTLACAFROLATINSINSPA/Resources/ECUADOR_final.pdf
 Stubbs, J. Gender in Development: A Long Haul-But We're Getting There! Development in Practice. Vol. 10, No. 3/4, 10th Anniversary Issue (Aug., 2000), pp. 535–542. Taylor & Francis, Ltd.  Retrieved from: https://www.jstor.org/stable/4029581?seq=1#page_scan_tab_contents

1959 births
Living people
21st-century Dominican Republic women politicians
21st-century Dominican Republic politicians
Dominican Republic politicians
People from Samaná Province
People from Santo Domingo